Hellmut Flashar (3 December 1929 – 17 August 2022) was a German classical philologist and translator.

Life and career 
Flashar was born in Hamburg on 3 December 1929. As a professor, he taught at the University of Bochum (1965–1982) and the University of Munich (1982–1997).

Academic publications 
Books, essays, and comments on the following texts:

The Dialogue Ion as a Testimony of Platonic Philosophy (1958), Aristotle, Problemata Physica (1962, 4th ed. 1991), Melancholy in Ancient Medical Theories (1966), The Epitaphios of Pericles (1969), Aristotle, Mirabilia (1972, 3rd ed. 1990), Aristotle in: Plan of the History of Philosophy (1983, 2nd extended edition 2004), staging of antiquity (1991, 2nd extended and updated edition of 2009), Sophocles (2000 ), Felix Mendelssohn-Bartholdy and the Greek Tragedy (2001).

Numerous journal articles (39 contributions) to 1989 summarized in: HF, Eidola, Selected Little Writings (1989), then another 23 contributions summarized in: Spectra. Small contributions on drama, philosophy and antiquity, Tübingen 2004 (Classica Monacensia 29).  Publication of two records and a CD with music to the ancient drama. Festschrift: Orchestra (1994)

Death 
Flashar died on 17 August 2022, at the age of 92.

References

External links
 Hellmut Flashar's Blog

1929 births
2022 deaths
Writers from Hamburg
German classical philologists
University of Tübingen alumni
Academic staff of the Ludwig Maximilian University of Munich
Academic staff of Ruhr University Bochum
Academic staff of the University of Tübingen
German translators
Translators from Greek
Translators to German
German medical historians
Recipients of the Cross of the Order of Merit of the Federal Republic of Germany
German male non-fiction writers